Xiriana may be:
 Ninam language (Xirianá), a Yanomaman language
 Shiriana language (Xiriâna), an Arawakan language